Bad Hurt is a 2015 American film directed by Mark Kemble. It stars Theo Rossi, Karen Allen and Johnny Whitworth. The film is based on the play Badhurt on Cedar Street.

Plot
A Staten Island family cares for their Iraq veteran son with PTSD and their mentally disabled daughter.

Cast
 Theo Rossi as Todd Kendall
 Ashley Williams as Jessie
 Johnny Whitworth as Kent Kendall
 Iris Gilad  as Dee Dee Kendall
 Calvin Dutton as Willy Crum
 Karen Allen as Elaine Kendall
 Michael Harney as Ed Kendall
 Dorothy Lyman as Mrs. Salisbury

Reception
The film got 79% positive reviews at Rotten Tomatoes. In The Hollywood Reporter, Jordan Mintzer wrote that the film "marks a promising directorial debut from playwright Mark Kemble". Gary Goldstein of the Los Angeles Times found it "too airless and depressing".

References

External links
 

2015 films
2010s English-language films
Films about disability